Aleksander Tassa (5 July 1882 Tartu – 23 March 1955 Tallinn) was an Estonian writer and art personnel.

He was one of the founder of Pallas Art School and society Pallas. 1918-1922 he was the director of society Pallas. 1931-1940 he was the director of Estonian National Museum's art and cultural history department.

He died in 1955 and he is buried at Rahumäe Cemetery.

References

1882 births
1955 deaths
Estonian male short story writers
Estonian dramatists and playwrights
20th-century Estonian writers
Estonian painters
20th-century Estonian painters
20th-century Estonian male artists
Estonian illustrators
Estonian caricaturists
Writers from Tartu
People from Tartu
Burials at Rahumäe Cemetery